Volos railway station is a railway station in Volos, Greece. located within the city itself (close to the harbour). Opened on 22 April 1884 by the Thessaly Railways (now part of OSE). Today Hellenic Train operates three daily local trains to Larissa. Previously Thessaly Railways operated a narrow gauge service to Mileai from Volos, however this service now starts and terminates from Ano Lechonia (12 km from Volos).

History 
The station was opened on 22 April 1884, an inauguration led by King George. The station building (and the line) was designed by the Italian Evaristo de Chirico, (father of Giorgio de Chirico) soon after the liberation of Central Greece from the Ottomans. Part of the station still functions in this picturesque 1884 structure, reminiscent of a stately home to some. The building, built between 1882 and 1883 under Evaristo De Chirico, served as the administrative headquarters of the Thessaly Railways. The building remains much the same the day it was constructed and is one of the few buildings that survived the earthquakes that hit Volos in the 1950s. Its roof is birch and has a wooden outline. Outside the station there is a statue of the goddess Athena, the work of the Italian sculptor I. Previsan.

In 1955 Thessaly Railways was absorbed into Hellenic State Railways (SEK). In 1960 the line from Larissa to Volos was converted to standard gauge and connected though Larissa to the mainline from Athens to Thessaloniki, allowing OSE to run through services to Volos from Athens and Thessaloniki. Volos station was converted to dual gauge, in order to accommodate trains of the two branches. Parts of the station and the track towards the city center were at this period of a unique triple-gauge system: standard gauge for Larissa trains, metre gauge for Kalambaka trains and  gauge for Pellon trains. In 1970 OSE became the legal successor to the SEK, taking over responsibilities for most of Greece's rail infrastructure.

In 2001 the infrastructure element of OSE was created, known as GAIAOSE, it would henceforth be responsible for the maintenance, of stations, bridges and other elements of the network, as well as the leasing and the sale of railway assists. In 2005, TrainOSE was created as a brand within OSE to concentrate on rail services and passenger interface.

In 2009, with the Greek debt crisis unfolding OSE's Management was forced to reduce services across the network. Timetables were cutback and routes closed, as the government-run entity attempted to reduce overheads. In 2017 OSE's passenger transport sector was privatised as TrainOSE, currently, a wholly owned subsidiary of Ferrovie dello Stato Italiane infrastructure, including stations, remained under the control of OSE.

The section from Volos to Agria line was operated as a heritage railway by "The Friends of Pelion Railway" between 1987 and 1994, but OSE forced them to terminate the operation in a row over competition. However, in 1996 OSE reopened the section from Ano Lechonia to Mileai as a heritage railway, initially using steam traction and converting to diesel traction in 1999. However, there is currently no connection between Volos and Ano Lekhonia.

On 12 November 2021, it was reported that the station was closing after 137 years as a staffed station, the decision has been greeted by local opposition and even debates in parliament. In May 2022, INTRAKAT was given the go-ahead for the €82.890.000 electrification and signalling upgrades of the Larissa–Volos line, due for completion in 2025. In July 2022, the station began being served by Hellenic Train, the rebranded TranOSE

Today the first floor of the station building is given over to a museum.

Facilities
The ground-level station is accessed via stairs or a ramp. It has 1 Side platform and 1 Island platform, with the main station buildings located on the westbound platform. Both platforms are equipped with waiting shelters with access to platform 2 via a 'barrow crossing'. The Station is housed in the original stone-built station, which has a staffed booking office with a cafe in the station. There are toilets and parking onsite. Local and regional buses stop in the forecourt. At platform level, there are sheltered seating but currently no Dot-matrix display departure and arrival screens, however, timetable poster boards on both platforms are available. There is a passenger car park, with free parking. Outside the station is a bus stop where local and regional buses to Larissa call.

Services 
Today, the city is served by direct lines to the rest of Greece via Larissa, and the railway complex houses facilities for train maintenance. Volos is directly linked with Athens once per day, with Thessaloniki twice per day, and with Larissa 15 times a day with services run by Hellenic Train.

In the past Volos was served by railway lines of three different gauges, the metre gauge line of Thessaly Railways to Kalambaka, the standard gauge line to Larissa and the  gauge line to Pelion. Remnants of triple gauge lines still exist near the station. Currently, the Pelion railway operates for touristic heritage service every Saturday, Sunday and public holiday from mid-April to the end of October from Ano Lehonia. The train runs every day during July and August and can be reached using the Volos–Lehonia-Platanidia bus line, currently no services call at Volos.

Station layout

Gallery

References

External links

 Το Τρενάκι του Πηλίου - Greek Travel Pages

Transport in Magnesia (regional unit)
Railway stations in Thessaly
Railway stations opened in 1884
Buildings and structures in Magnesia (regional unit)
Volos
Eclectic architecture in Greece
Thessaly Railways